Mutilla  is a genus of parasitoid wasp belonging to the family Mutillidae.

Species
 Mutilla europaea Linnaeus, 1758 
 Mutilla marginata Baer, 1848 
 Mutilla quinquemaculata Cyrillo, 1787

References
 Biolib

Mutillidae
Hymenoptera genera
Taxa named by Carl Linnaeus